Shao Yuanchong (1890 – 14 December 1936) was a founding member of the Xinhai Revolution and a politician of the Republic of China. He served as the vice president of the Legislative Yuan and the mayor of Hangchow and was one of the authors of the National Anthem of the Republic of China.

References 

1890 births
1936 deaths
People of the 1911 Revolution
Republic of China politicians from Zhejiang
Politicians from Shaoxing
Mayors of Hangzhou
Columbia University alumni